Neoklis Sarris (Greek: Νεοκλής Σαρρής) was a Greek Academic, Jurist and Politician. He was born in Istanbul on 5 May 1940, and died in Athens on 19 November 2011 from cancer.

Education
Neoklis Sarris was a graduate of the ‘Phanar Greek Orthodox College’ (known in Greek as the ‘Great School of the Nation’). He studied Law, Political and Economic Sciences at the Universities of Athens and Constantinople (Istanbul) and Psychology in Geneva. He received his PhD from the Aristotle University of Thessaloniki.

Teaching
He was professor of Sociology of History at the Panteion University, specializing mainly in the Ottoman period. He was President of the Panteion University Sociology Department.

Politics

At age of 20, Neoklis Sarris was a political advisor of the Ecumenical Patriarch Athenagoras. He was a consultant of George Mavros and John Zighdis, who were Presidents of the Union Democratic Centre party (E.DI.K.). After the death of the second, he was appointed the presidency of the party by the Union of the Democratic Centre, and thus became the fourth president after George Papandreou, George Mavros, and John Zigdis in successive order. In the late 70s, he was an (informal) mediator between Greece and Turkey, negotiating with all of the Turkish leadership and the Prime Minister Mustafa Bülent Ecevit and transferring their thoughts to the Greek Prime Minister through Georgios Mavros. He has published numerous articles in scientific journals and in the daily press. In 2010, he edited the book by academic and Turkish Foreign Minister Ahmet Davutoğlu ‘Strategic Depth. The International Position of Turkey’. Yet, he has written the preface in many Greek books and Turkish scholar publications, while many of his works remain unpublished.

References 
 http://www.paron.gr/v3/new.php?id=50186&colid=37&catid=42&dt=2016-03-06&search=%CD%E5%EF%EA%EB%DE%F2+%D3%E1%F1%F1%DE%F2
 http://www.paron.gr/v3/new.php?id=50186&colid=37&catid=42&dt=2016-03-06&search=%CD%E5%EF%EA%EB%DE%F2+%D3%E1%F1%F1%DE%F2
 http://www.epikaira.gr/article/neoklis-sarris-1940-2011-to-sathro-oikodomima-tisellinotoyrkikis-filias
 http://www.politeianet.gr/books/sarris-neoklis-arsenidis-osmaniki-pragmatikotita-ditomo-167535

1940 births
2011 deaths
Politics of Greece
Turkish emigrants to Greece
Greek politicians
Deaths from cancer in Greece
Istanbul University Faculty of Law alumni
Constantinopolitan Greeks
Politicians from Istanbul
Academics from Istanbul
Diplomats from Istanbul